McWalter is a surname. Notable people with the surname include:

David McWalter (1891–1918), Scottish footballer
Mark McWalter (born 1968), Scottish footballer
Patrick McWalter (born 1984), Irish footballer
Tony McWalter (born 1945), English politician